Shirley Rumierk is an American actress known for her role as Vanessa Suarez in Rise and as Autumn Cox in Manifest.

Early life and education
Shirley Rumierk was born and brought up in Hell's Kitchen, Manhattan, New York City. and is of Puerto Rican and Colombian descent.
Rumierk was first introduced to acting when at ten years old she was a participant of the 52nd Street Project, a program that introduces children in Manhattan, to the world of theater by voluntary professionals.

Rumierk attended Trinity School on the Upper West Side and studied economics at Harvard University before switching her major to Hispanic studies, graduating in 1995. During her time at Harvard, Rumierk travelled to Cuba to study Cuban and Caribbean literature, history and architecture, sponsored by the University of Buffalo. Also, at that time, she decided to pursue an acting career, moved back to New York and took an acting conservatory program. Rumierk joined the Oliver Scholars, a non-profit organization serving high-achieving Black and Latino students, graduating in 1995 Rumierk, now an Alumni Council Member, hosted the Fifth Annual Oliver Scholars Gala at Guastavino’s, 59th Street, New York City in 2018.

Career 

Rumierk’s screen appearances were numerous but brief until she landed a recurring role in East Willy B in 2011. 

In 2016, she landed a main character role as Livvy in the film 11:55 , however, her big break came in 2018, as Vanessa Suarez in ten episodes of the NBC television series Rise. 

In 2019, She landed a recurring role as Autumn Cox for 4 episodes of NBC's Manifest. In 2020, Ruierk played a main role as Yolanda Carrion in the Netflix series Teenage Bounty Hunters. 

In 2021, she appeared in single episodes of Chicago P.D., and Scenes from a Marriage. In 2022, in single episodes of The Equalizer and East New York.

In 2023, she joined the cast of the upcoming Zach Braff film A Good Person which also stars Florence Pugh and Morgan Freeman.

Filmography

Film

Television

Video games

References

External links 
 
11:55 Film interview, Shirley Rumierk
Shirley Rumierk interview with The Actor's Audience

Living people
Actresses from New York City
American film actresses
American television actresses
American video game actresses
American voice actresses
Harvard University alumni
Hispanic and Latino American actresses
People from Hell's Kitchen, Manhattan
Year of birth missing (living people)
21st-century American actresses